CCDC92, or Limkain beta-2, is a protein which in humans is encoded by the CCDC92 gene. It is likely involved in DNA repair or reduction/oxidation reactions. The gene ubiquitously found in humans and is highly conserved across animals.

The CCDC92 gene is located at cytogenic location 12q24.31 and is 36,576 bases long with nine exons which codes for a 331 amino-acid long protein.

Protein 
The protein CCDC92 (Accession Number: NP_079416) is found in the nucleus in humans. It has one domain, coiled-coil domain 92, from amino acids 23-82, which has no known function. The protein is rich in histidine and glutamic acid, and is deficient in phenylalanine. It has a molecular weight of 37kDal, a PI of 9.3, and has no charged domains, hydrophobic domains, or transmembrane domains. CCDC92 has conserved predicted phosphorylation sites at S211, S325, T21, T52, T122, Y130 and conserved glycosylation sites at S183 and T244.

Sequence 
 mtsphfssyd egpldvsmaa tnlenqlhsa qknllflqre hastlkglhs eirrlqqhct dltyeltvks seqtgdgtsk sselkkrcee leaqlkvken enaellkele qknamitvle ntikerekky leelkakshk ltllsseleq rastiaylts qlhaakkklm sssgtsdasp sgspvlasyk pappkdklpe tprrrmkksl saplhpefee vyrfgaesrk lllrepvdam pdptpfllar esaevhlike rplvippias drsgeqhspa rekphkahvg vahrihhatp  pqaqpevktl avdqvnggkv vrkhsgtdrt v

Structure 
There is a large alpha helical section near the start of the protein which extends to near the midpoint of the protein, then two smaller helical sections are near the end (see conceptual translation below). 

The tertiary structure of CCDC92 was predicted using I-TASSER and is shown to the right. I-TASSER has moderate confidence in the reliability of this structure (C-Score of -1.61). This structure is remarkably similar to that of an antiparallel domain in the protein PcsB in Streptococcus pneumoniae. This protein is involved in cleaving the cell wall, however the antiparallel domain's function is unknown.

Expression 

In humans, CCDC92 is expressed ubiquitously at a medium to high level (shown right). In dogs and mice, it is expressed ubiquitously, however at significantly lower levels.

Orthologs 
CCDC92 has orthologs as far back as an acorn worm, which diverged from humans 750 million years ago. The most highly conserved domain is the coiled-coil domain 92, which is amino acids 23-83 in humans. This region has no known functions and is not present in any other gene.

CCDC92 shares a 54% similarity with the protein SPPG_05228 in the fungus Spizellomyces punctatus. Spizellomyces punctatus has an 8 amino acid stretch (LKGLHSEI) which matches perfectly with the coil-coiled domain 92 of the human variant. This sequence is present in primarily proteins which are involved in reduction/oxidation reactions, and some bind to DNA.

Function 
The precise function of CCDC92 is not definitively known. However, based on interacting proteins, conserved sequences, and subcellular localization (nucleus), it can be discerned that a likely function of CCDC92 is DNA repair.

Interacting Proteins

Clinical significance

In large B-cell Lymphona Lines, CCDC92 expression is increased in the presence of a histone deacetylase inhibitor (Panobinostat) or a hypomethylating agent (Decitabine). It is further increased when these two drugs are combined and increase expression by up to 10 percentiles. In leukemia cell line, CCDC92 expression is also increased in the presence of a tyrosine-kinase inhibitor, Imantinib

These two changes could be significant if CCDC92 is involved in repairing damaged oncogenes. If that was the case, any of the pharmaceuticals which increased CCDC92 expression could be used to introduce more of it into the body to find damaged DNA sequences and repair them.

References

Sources 
Proteins
DNA repair